Briģi is a village located in Briģi Parish, Ludza Municipality in the Latgale region of Latvia.

External links 
 

Towns and villages in Latvia
Ludza Municipality
Lyutsinsky Uyezd
Latgale